Into the Wild Life is the third studio album by American rock band Halestorm.  It was scheduled for release on April 3, 2015, via Atlantic Records but due to unforeseen circumstances, it was pushed back by a week worldwide. The album was released in Europe on April 10, 2015, in the UK on April 13, in North America on April 14, and in Japan on April 15. The album peaked at #5 on the Billboard 200, making it their highest charting release to date in the US.

Critical reception 

Into the Wild Life received generally favorable reviews from music critics. According to Metacritic, the album received an average score of 67/100 based on five reviews.

James Christopher Monger at AllMusic regarded "I Am the Fire", "Gonna Get Mine", "Dear Daughter", and "Mayhem" as some of Halestorm's best songs, adding, "the band is undeniably tight and flush with ideas, and Hale is such a force of nature that the occasional foray into AOR snooze-ville can be forgiven." Kory Grow from Rolling Stone gave Into the Wild Life a positive review of 3/5 stars, stating, "While Hale has packed Into the Wild Life with similarly themed tunes, like the anti-boredom anthem "Mayhem", what makes it interesting are the risks Halestorm took this time, especially the country influences seeping into the Tennessee studio where they recorded."

Dom Lawson, reporting for The Guardian, wrote a more negative review of the album, giving it 2 stars and saying: "Joyce's heavy-handed production has transformed a likable hard rock band into a slick, mainstream pop act, albeit one with a penchant for power chords and blazing guitar solos. Hale's voice is still impressive, but from Scream's incongruous electronic pulse to Amen's leaden Nickelback-isms, Into the Wild Life is as plastic and cynical as it gets."

Following Into the Wild Life'''s success, Halestorm was nominated for the Breakthrough Band of the Year award at the 2015 Metal Hammer Golden Gods Awards, alongside In This Moment, The Amity Affliction, and Bury Tomorrow, but ultimately lost out to BABYMETAL.

 Track listing 
All tracks are produced by Jay Joyce.

 Personnel 
Credits adapted from the liner notes of Into the Wild Life''.

 Dave Bassett – composer
 Nate Campany – composer
 Anne Declemente – A&R
 Anthony Delia – marketing
 Richard Dodd – mastering
 Pete Ganbarg – A&R
 Arejay Hale – composer, drums, group member, vocals
 Lzzy Hale – composer, group member, rhythm guitar, piano, lead vocals
 Halestorm – primary artist
 Jason Hall – engineer, mixing
 Natalie Hemby – composer
 Joe Hottinger – composer, group member, lead guitar, vocals
 Jay Joyce – composer, engineer, mixing, producer
 Alex Kirzhner – art direction, design
 Dylan Lancaster – assistant engineer
 Zachary Malloy  – composer
 Jake Giles Netter – photography
 Daniel O'Neil – guitar technician
 Brian Ranney – package production
 Paul Simmons – drum technician
 Josh Smith – composer, group member, guitar (bass), piano, vocals
 Scott Christopher Stevens – composer
 Caleb VanBuskirk – assistant engineer

Charts

References

Halestorm albums
2015 albums
Atlantic Records albums